Albert Gabriel Rigolot (28 November 1862, Paris - 25 April 1932, Paris) was a French landscape painter.

Biography 
He took his first art lessons in the public schools of the 16th arrondissement. Later, he studied with Léon Germain Pelouse and Auguste Allongé and had his début at the Salon des Artistes Français in 1886.

He then became a teacher at the Académie Julian, where his pupils included a group known as the "French Art Missionaries" (Lorus Pratt, John B. Fairbanks, Edwin Evans and John Hafen), who had been sent from Utah in 1890 by the LDS Church to  improve their skills for painting murals in the Salt Lake Temple.

Rigolot was heavily influenced by the Barbizon school. After a trip to Algeria in 1896, he began to produce works in the Oriental style and became a member of the Société des Peintres Orientalistes Français.

In 1900, he was among those painters commissioned to provide decorations for Le Train Bleu, a famous restaurant inside the Gare de Lyon. That same year, he was awarded a Silver Medal at the Exposition Universelle. The following year, he became a Chevalier in the Legion d'Honneur.

His son Yves also became a painter; working under the name .

See also

List of Orientalist artists
Orientalism

References

Further reading 
 Livres Group, Peintre Orientaliste: Albert Maignan, Felix Vallotton, Albert Gabriel Rigolot, Charles Gleyre, Raden Saleh, William Holman Hunt, Alfred Bastien, General Books (2010) ,

External links 

 ArtNet: more works by Rigolot

1862 births
1932 deaths
Landscape painters
Orientalist painters
19th-century French painters
French male painters
20th-century French painters
20th-century French male artists
19th-century French male artists